The Travel Promotion Act of 2009 (Sec. 9) is a law creating the Corporation for Travel Promotion (d.b.a. Brand USA), a public-private partnership tasked with promoting tourism in the United States. To fund the Corporation's activities, the Act provides for a fee of $10 for use of the Electronic System for Travel Authorization (ESTA). Additionally, the Act authorizes a further charge to recover the costs of providing and administrating the ESTA.

The House passed the bill by a vote of 358–66 in October 2009, and the Senate followed on February 25, 2010 with a vote of 78–18. President Barack Obama signed the bill into law on March 4, 2010.

U.S. Customs and Border Protection has announced they will levy an additional $4 fee (bringing the total to $14) for visitors to the United States for the cost of administering the ESTA.

The reactions of the European Union have been critical and suggestions of a similar fee have been raised on grounds of reciprocity.

Brand USA 
Brand USA (formerly Corporation for Travel Promotion) gets matching funds from the federal government equivalent to what it raises from the private sector, not to exceed a maximum of $100 million.

Related legislation
On July 22, 2014, the House voted to pass the Travel Promotion, Enhancement, and Modernization Act of 2014 (H.R. 4450; 113th Congress), a bill that would extend the provisions of the Travel Promotion Act of 2009, which established the Corporation for Travel Promotion, through September 30, 2020, and impose new performance and procurement requirements on the corporation. The American Society of Travel Agents (ASTA) supported the bill. ASTA President Zane Kerby said that the bill "is essential to marketing the United States as a desirable destination for international tourists, conferences and business." The U.S. Travel Association also supported the bill. One study of the program by Oxford Economics indicated that the program "generates an estimated $47 in economic benefits for every $1 spent on travel promotion."

References

 EU Ambassador John Bruton: Statement On The Travel Promotion Act Of 2009 (internet archive), June 2009

United States Department of Homeland Security
Acts of the 111th United States Congress
Public–private partnership projects in the United States
Tourism law